Jackson's shrew (Crocidura jacksoni) is a species of mammal in the family Soricidae. It is found in Burundi, Democratic Republic of the Congo, Kenya, Rwanda, South Sudan, and Uganda. Its natural habitats are subtropical or tropical moist lowland or montane forest, and heavily degraded former forest.

References
 Oguge, N., Hutterer, R. & Howell, K. 2004.  Crocidura jacksoni.   2006 IUCN Red List of Threatened Species.   Downloaded on 30 July 2007.

Jackson's shrew
Fauna of East Africa
Mammals of Kenya
Mammals of Tanzania
Mammals of Uganda
Mammals of Rwanda
Mammals of Burundi
Jackson's shrew
Jackson's shrew
Taxonomy articles created by Polbot